"A Heavy Abacus" is the third and final single from Welsh alternative rock band The Joy Formidable's debut album The Big Roar, released in July 2011. A music video for "A Heavy Abacus" was directed by Christopher Mills. The song charted at number 25 on the Billboard Alternative Songs, and stayed on chart for fifteen weeks.

Track listing
Digital download
A Heavy Abacus - 3:40

Personnel
 Ritzy Bryan – composer, guitar, vocals
 Rhydian Dafydd Davies – bass, composer, illustrations, vocals
 Matt Thomas – drums

Charts

References

2011 singles
The Joy Formidable songs
2009 songs
Atlantic Records singles